Deva Victrix, or simply Deva, was a legionary fortress and town in the Roman province of Britannia on the site of the modern city of Chester. The fortress was built by the Legio II Adiutrix in the 70s AD as the Roman army advanced north against the Brigantes, and rebuilt completely over the next few decades by the Legio XX Valeria Victrix. In the early 3rd century the fortress was again rebuilt. The legion probably remained at the fortress until the late 4th or early 5th century, upon which it fell into disuse.

A civilian settlement, or canabae, grew around the fortress. Chester's Roman Amphitheatre, south-east of the fortress, is the largest-known military amphitheatre in Britain. The civilian settlement remained after the Romans departed, eventually becoming the present-day city of Chester. There were peripheral settlements around Roman Deva, including Boughton, the source of the garrison's water supply, and Handbridge, the site of a sandstone quarry and Minerva's Shrine. The shrine is the only in situ, rock-cut Roman shrine in Great Britain.

The fortress contained barracks, granaries, headquarters, military baths, and an unusual elliptical building which had it been finished may have been intended to act as the governor of Britain's headquarters.

History

Foundation 

According to the 1st- and 2nd-century geographer Ptolemy, Deva was in the lands of the Cornovii. Their land bordered that of the Brigantes in the north and the Ordovices in the west and included parts of what is now Cheshire, Shropshire, and north Wales. When the Romans' treaty with the Brigantes—who occupied most of what is now Northern England—failed the Romans embarked on military conquest of the area. The campaigns were initially led by Sextus Julius Frontinus and later Gnaeus Julius Agricola. Their expansion into the north of Britannia during the reign of Vespasian meant that the Romans needed a new military base. Chester was a strategic site for a fortress, commanding access to the sea via the River Dee and dividing the Brigantes from the Ordovices. Legio II Adiutrix was sent to Chester and began the construction of a legionary fortress in the mid-70s AD.

The fortress was built on a sandstone bluff, overlooking the bridge crossing the river and close to the natural harbour which is today occupied by the Chester Racecourse. The bend in the River Dee provided protection from the south and the west. The river was navigable up to the sandstone ridge, so positioning the fortress beyond it would have made access to the harbour difficult.

Lead ingots discovered in Chester indicate that construction was probably under way by 74 AD. There may already have been military buildings on the site, but if so they were demolished to allow the construction of the fortress. The first buildings were constructed from wood, probably for convenience. They were gradually replaced by more permanent structures built from locally quarried sandstone. The rampart was made from turf laid over sand, clay, rubble, and layers of logs.

The fortress was laid out in the traditional "playing card" shape—rectangular with rounded corners—and had four gates: north, east, south and west. It covered , making it the largest constructed in Britain during the 70s. An estimated  of timber was used in the first phase of the fortress's construction; buildings outside but associated with the fortress, such as the harbour and the amphitheatre, would have required an additional . The fortress contained barracks, granaries (horrea), headquarters (principia) and baths (thermae). The barrack blocks each measured  and were built using wattle and daub.

Etymology 

The name Deva Victrix derives from "goddess", and the Roman fortress was named after the goddess of the River Dee; the Latin for "goddess" is dea
or

diva.

There is an alternative source for the naming of the settlement which suggests that the Roman name for the fortress was adopted directly from the British name of the river. It is thought that the title "victrix" in the name of the fortress was taken from the title of the Legio XX Valeria Victrix who were based at Deva; victrix is Latin for victorious. The name for the city of Chester derives from the Latin word castrum (plural: castra), meaning "fort" or "army camp"; "-chester" and "-caster" are common suffixes in the names of other English cities that began as Roman camps.

Under Legio XX Valeria Victrix 

In 88 AD, the Emperor Domitian ordered the Legio II Adiutrix to the lower Danube. The Legio XX Valeria Victrix was deployed to garrison Deva Victrix, abandoning the fort they had been building in Scotland, at Inchtuthil. On their arrival they began to rebuild Deva, first in timber and from the end of the 1st century in stone. An estimated  of stone were used to build the new fortress defences. The timber barracks were replaced with stone buildings of a similar size.

During the 2nd century, at least part of the Legio XX Valeria Victrix took part in the construction of Hadrian's Wall, leading to some sections of the fortress being abandoned and others being allowed to fall into disrepair. The Legio XX Valeria Victrix probably went on campaign in 196 under Decimus Clodius Albinus into Gaul, leaving Deva under-garrisoned. They would have suffered heavy losses in Gaul before returning to Britain.

Following attacks against barbarians in the early 3rd century under Septimius Severus, the fortress at Deva was again rebuilt, this time using an estimated  of stone. During the 4th century the size of the legion, and therefore of the garrison, may have diminished in line with the rest of the empire's forces.

Decline and abandonment 

Most of the fortress's major buildings were still being maintained in the second half of the 4th century and the barracks were still inhabited. Before 383 AD, soldiers at Chester were being paid by coins from the imperial mints; after this the soldiers may have been removed by Magnus Maximus when he invaded Gaul in 383. The Notitia Dignitatum, written in around 395, does not record any military units garrisoned at Deva, indicating the fortress was no longer used by the military at this stage. If it was still used by the military, this would have ended by 410 when the Romans retreated from Britannia and the Western Roman Emperor Honorius told the cities of Britain to look to their own defences against invaders. The civilians probably continued to use the fortress and its defences as protection from raiders from the Irish Sea.

Inhabitation of Chester continued on a lesser scale once the legions had left. Buildings would have fallen into disrepair, although some of the larger structures are known to have survived for some time. The town nevertheless probably remained the military and administrative centre of the region. After the arrival of the Anglo-Saxons, the settlement became known as Legacaestir, meaning "City of the Legions" in Old English. Medieval chroniclers believed the church of Saint Peter and Saint Paul—later the site of Chester Cathedral—to be of Roman origin, although no evidence has been discovered to support this. When Chester became an Anglo-Saxon burh in 907, the walls of the fortress were repaired and incorporated into the defences. Much of the Roman masonry was reused in later periods.

Later history and investigation
In the 14th century, Ranulf Higden, a monk in Chester, described some of the Roman remains, including the sewers and tombstones. Antiquarians began to take interest in the remains in the 17th century and interest continued to grow in the 18th century, fed by accounts of Roman Chester and discoveries such as an altar to Jupiter Tanarus. Jupiter Tanarus—also Taranis—was the Romanised version of the god Taranis who was the equivalent of Jupiter the god of thunder. In 1725, William Stukeley recorded the Roman arches of the east gate; they were demolished in 1768. Over the next century, accidental discoveries continued, such as parts of the Roman bath complex outside the fortress which were destroyed by a late-18th-century housing development.

The Chester Archaeological Society, founded in 1849, acquired artefacts discovered in Chester and undertook excavations where possible; the Grosvenor Museum was opened in 1886 to allow the public to view the society's collection. The society continued to work in Chester, recording information on the fortress and its surrounding settlement, often as building works destroyed the sites. Between 1962 and 1999, about 50 excavations were carried out in and around the fortress, revealing new information about Deva Victrix. Between 2007 and 2009, excavations were carried out at the amphitheatre on behalf of Chester City Council and in association with English Heritage.

Civilian settlement 

A civilian settlement (canabae legionis) was gradually established outside the walls of the fortress; it probably began as a collection of traders who became prosperous from dealing with the fortress. The settlement was administered by an elected council rather than by the legion. As legionaries retired many settled in the canabae legionis, effectively making it a veteran colony. Cemeteries were located alongside the roads leading to the settlement, beyond built-up areas. The Grosvenor Museum has over 150 tombstones, the largest collection of Roman tombstones from a single site in Britain. Most of them were used to repair the north wall in the 4th century. Settlement extended around the fortress to the east, south, and west; shops fronted the roadside for about  beyond the fortress walls. To the east was the legion's parade ground, civilian baths were built to the west, and to the south was a mansio, a large coaching house for travelling government officials. The buildings of the canabae legionis were originally timber, but during the early 2nd century began to be rebuilt in stone. The settlement expanded throughout the 2nd and 3rd centuries as the population increased. Once the legion had left, the civilian settlement continued, eventually becoming part of the town of Chester.

Indeed, scholars such as Christopher Snyder believe that during the 5th and 6th centuries—approximately from 410 AD when Roman legions withdrew, to 597 AD when St. Augustine of Canterbury arrived—southern Britain preserved a sub-Roman society that was able to survive the attacks from the Anglo-Saxons and even use a vernacular Latin (called British Latin) for an active culture. There is even the possibility that this vernacular Latin lasted to the late seventh century in the area of Chester, where amphorae and archaeological remnants of a local Romano-British culture at Deva Victrix have been found.

Legionary quarry 

The Roman fortress of Deva was constructed from local sandstone, which was quarried across the river to the south of the fortress. Traces of the quarry are visible in Handbridge. In the 2nd century, a shrine to the Roman goddess Minerva was carved in the quarry for protection, perhaps by the quarry workers. Despite heavy weathering, the figure can be seen holding a spear and a shield with an owl above the left shoulder to symbolise wisdom. There is also a carving of an altar where offerings were left. The only rock-cut Roman shrine still in situ in Britain, the Minerva shrine is a Grade I listed building.

Legionary baths 

Deva Victrix had a large legionary bath complex (thermae) for the soldiers to maintain good hygiene and to use for leisure time. They were completed towards the end of Vespasian's reign. The complex was constructed from concrete and faced with stone.

The bath complex featured an entrance room (vestibulum), an exercise hall (basilica thermarum), a sweating room (sudatorium), a cold room with a cold pool (frigidarium), a warm room (tepidarium), and a hot room with a hot plunge bath (caldarium). An unsheltered exercise yard (palaestra) also formed part of the complex. The baths had mosaic floors and were heated by a hypocaust under-floor system connected to three furnaces. Such furnaces required several metric tons of wood each day.

The baths would have been in operation 24 hours a day, using an estimated  of water each day. The water was supplied from the springs in Boughton through underground lead pipes linked to the main aqueduct near the east gate. The water was then held in large tanks with concrete foundations, before being fed through the complex.

A large area of the baths was destroyed by building works in 1863 and during the construction of the Grosvenor Shopping Mall in 1963. A section of hypocaust remains in situ and is on display in the cellar of 39 Bridge Street.

Market Hall inscription 

This is a fragment of a much larger inscription, finely carved onto Welsh slate, which was discovered close to the fort's principia. Archaeologist David J.P. Mason has said that:

Examples of important inscriptions of this nature include treaties with local tribes and declarations of rights. The text of this inscription cannot be reconstructed from this small fragment, but it appears to talk about the "fortress", an "amicable conclusion", and someone being "against the regime".

Amphitheatre 

The amphitheatre was discovered in 1929, and the Chester Archaeological Society—with support from then Prime Minister Ramsay MacDonald—protected it from the construction of a road over the site. Excavations have revealed traces of late Iron Age cultivation, and they show that Deva's amphitheatre was built in two phases. The first amphitheatre was constructed from timber soon after the fortress and measured . In the Flavian period the amphitheatre was rebuilt in stone. This second phase was larger than the first and measured . Only the seating that was extended, not the arena itself. The latest excavations indicate that it was a two-tiered structure, capable of accommodating between 8,000 and 10,000 spectators. Its size has been used as an indicator of Deva's large civilian population, and of the presence of wealthy citizens. The second phase of building is the largest-known military amphitheatre in Britain. It is a protected as a Scheduled Ancient Monument.

The amphitheatre served a variety of purposes. As it was close to the fortress, it would have been used as a venue for weapons training as well as hosting spectacular entertainments involving acrobats, wrestlers, and professional gladiators. The buttresses were too insubstantial to be structural, so must have been decorative.

Part of a slate frieze depicting a retiarius, or net-fighter, was discovered in 1738, most likely dating to the 2nd century; it was probably used to decorate the tomb of a gladiator. Other finds included a small bronze statuette of a gladiator, parts of a Roman bowl depicting scenes from a gladiatorial contest, and part of a gladius sword handle. Much of the masonry from the amphitheatre was reused in the construction of the St John's Church and the monastery of St Mary.

Elliptical building 

In 1939, some paving and the walls of two unusual elliptical buildings were discovered, one atop the other. These "elliptical" buildings were partially uncovered behind Chester's market hall, and no similar buildings have been found in other legionary fortresses. The buildings were located near the centre of the fortress and they had their own bath buildings and a range of store rooms around the outside. The presence of a second bath building is unusual because legionary fortresses generally had just one set of internal baths. Construction on the site began around 77 AD and this was confirmed by a length of lead piping, which served a central water feature or fountain, which was stamped with the name of Emperor Vespasian. The first building was a prestigious edifice made with concrete foundations and finely dressed stonework, and was probably the finest building in the entire fortress. Technically speaking it was not elliptical, but arcuate, with the central hall being formed from two intersecting arcs, and this makes it unique in the Roman Empire. Its function is unknown. There was no seating within the arcs, which precludes a theatre, and the best guess of the archaeologists was that the twelve alcoves may have contained images of the gods, with the temple being dedicated to the twelve primary gods of the Roman pantheon. Or, alternatively, the oval shape may have represented the shape of the known Roman world, but there is no supporting evidence for this.

Traces of the concrete foundation for the water feature and its lead pipe work have been excavated. It is not certain if the first building was ever completed, but it had certainly been destroyed by the 90s AD and the site was subsequently used as the fortress rubbish dump for many decades.

The second elliptical building was built on top foundations of the first, and although the architect must have been aware of the exact layout of the previous building, the design of the second was slightly modified. Although the it looks very similar to the first, it used different diameters of arc to achieve a slightly "fatter" design. The second "elliptical" building was not constructed until about 220 AD, and this was confirmed by a coin of Emperor Elagabalus under one of the pavement slabs. It is thought that the second building may have survived until the end of Roman rule and influence in Britain.

Possible capital of Britannia 
The elliptical building is one of several differences between the fortress at Chester and other Roman fortresses in the province. Deva was 20% larger, than the fortresses of Eboracum (York)—later capital of Britannia Inferior—and Isca Augusta (Caerleon). Also, the stone curtain wall at Chester was constructed without mortar, using large sandstone blocks; this required greater skill and effort than the methods used to build the walls of Eboracum and Isca Augusta, and was usually reserved for the most important structures such as temples or city walls rather than town walls. The governor (Legatus Augusti pro praetore) when construction first started was Gnaeus Julius Agricola. Lead piping found in the elliptical building bears his name, the only evidence in Britain of a building under his direct control. These differences suggest that Deva may have been Agricola's administrative headquarters—in effect the capital of Britannia. This was speculated on in a Timewatch investigation.

Another factor pointing to Deva Victrix as a provincial capital is the presence of a port. From Deva, Ireland (Hibernia) was also accessible, a land which Agricola had plans to conquer. Also, the Flavian dynasty was expansionist, and Deva was closer to what would then have been the front, making administration quicker and easier. Furthermore, historian Vittorio Di Martino believes that Agricola could have chosen Deva Victrix as a possible future capital of Roman Britain because it was practically placed at the centre of the British isles, being located geographically at nearly the same distance from the westernmost shores of Ireland, the easternmost lands of Britannia and the Channel.

Regardless of the empire's plans for Deva, Londinium, the province's economic and trading centre, emerged as the capital of Britannia, reflecting a change in imperial policy from expansionism to consolidation.

See also 

Chester city walls
History of Chester
Minerva's Shrine, Chester
Via Devana

References

Notes

Bibliography 
Primary

Secondary

Further reading

External links 

'Chester: a Virtual Stroll Around the Walls'
An Archaeological Research Framework for Chester
See page 20 of PDF for a map of archaeological remains from the Roman period in and around Chester. Finds are concentrated within the fortress, the areas to the north, south, west, and along the road extending to the east.

Roman sites in Cheshire
79 establishments
Populated places established in the 1st century
History of Chester
Military history of Cheshire
Roman fortifications in England
Roman towns and cities in England
Archaeological sites in Cheshire
70s establishments in the Roman Empire
1st-century establishments in Roman Britain
Roman legionary fortresses in England